Karolina Maria Skog (née Algotsson; on 30 March 1976) is a Swedish politician who served as Minister for the Environment from 25 May 2016 to 21 January 2019. She is a member of the Green Party and served as City Commissioner in Malmö Municipality from 2010 until being appointed cabinet minister.

References

External links
Karolina Skog at the Green Party

1976 births
Living people
Swedish Ministers for the Environment
Lund University alumni
People from Kristianstad Municipality
Members of the Riksdag 2018–2022
Members of the Riksdag from the Green Party
Women government ministers of Sweden
Women members of the Riksdag
21st-century Swedish women politicians